Maximos II Hakim, was Patriarch of the Melkite Greek Catholic Church from 1760 to 1761.

Life
Maximos Hakim was born in Aleppo circa 1689 and entered in the religious order of the Basilian Chouerites, of which he became general superior on 29 November 1729. In 1732 he was elected by the clergy and laity as the metropolitan bishop of Aleppo for both the Melkite Catholic and Melkite Orthodox parties. He was consecrated bishop by the former bishop of Aleppo, Gerosimos, one of the founder of the Basilian Chouerite Order. This situation could not last long and when in 1750 the Patriarchate of Constantinople appointed a new Orthodox bishop, also in Aleppo the hierarchy was definitely split, with Maximos who remained the bishop for only the Melkite Catholics. Due to this situation he had to live for long times in the safe motherhouse of his order in Lebanon.

In 1759 patriarch Cyril VI Tanas appointed as successor his nephew Athanasius Jawhar and died shortly later in January 1760. Although Athanasius' election was supported by the bishops of the Basilian Salvatorian Order (both Cyril VI and Athanasius were Salvatorians), the Basilian Chouerite bishops contested such election pointing out that Athanasius was not in the legal age to be appointed bishop. Rome, unaware that appointing a nephew was a common use in the Melkite Church before the union with Rome, did not confirm Athanasius' election and on 1 August 1760 appointed Maximos Hakim as Patriarch.

The Apostolic Legate Dominique Lanza arrived in Lebanon to carry the news only in June 1761, and on 23 July 1761 he summoned a synod of the Melkite bishops to formalize the election of Maximos II Hakim, who was already ill. Maximos II Hakim died shortly later on 15 November 1761.

Notes

Syrian Melkite Greek Catholics
Melkite Greek Catholic Patriarchs of Antioch
1761 deaths
Eastern Catholic monks
People from Aleppo
Year of birth unknown